Domna Maksimovna Khomyuk (née Zakharova, née Захарова; born September 10, 1954 in Koarrdõgk, Murmansk, Soviet Union) is a Kildin Sámi zootechnician, author, translator, and musician. She is also active in the revitalization of the Kildin Sámi language and culture.

Early life
Domna Maksimovna Khomyuk was born on September 10, 1954 in Koarrdõgk ( and ). Her parents were reindeer herders and decorated war veterans. Her father was Maksim Antonovich Zakharov (1919–1984) and her mother Mariya Ivanovna Zakharova (1922–2008). Together they went on to have a total of 9 children

In 1962, the Soviet Union decided to build the Serebryanskaya hydroelectric power station near where they lived. To do this, they had to dam the Koarrdõgk River. A few years later, when the entire village of Koarrdõgk was going to be flooded and submerged under the new reservoir, the family were moved to Lovozero.

Education and career
Khomyuk majored in zootechnology at Sortavala Agricultural School. After graduation, she worked more than 25 years in an agricultural production cooperative. Later on, she started working in various public administratation posts. In addition, she started to serve the public in various positions of responsibility such as the 10 years she spent as the president of the Lovozero election committee, as a member on the board of the yoikers' association Juoigiid Searvi, and as a member of the Working Group of Indigenous Peoples in the Barents-Euro Arctic Region.

Music
The traditional vocal music of the Kildin Sámi called luvvt or livvt ( or луввьт) has been a part of Khomyuk's life since she was born. Both Ageeva's mother and grandmother sang luvvts and her mother was a famous singer of them. Her mother sang these with music groups like Lujavvr and Ojar. Some of her luvvts have been recorded; these are archived in Norway, Estonia, Germany, etc. Khomyuk's sister, Anfisa Ageeva, is also well-known for her luvvt singing.

In 2002, the year after her sister won the yoik category of the Sámi Grand Prix, Khomyuk entered the yoik and song competition for the first time. Her entry for the yoik category was a luvvt called Luojavr, which describes Lovozero, her home town. In 2003 and 2019 she competed in the same category, but now as a duo with her sister Anfisa Ageeva. In 2003, their entry was entitled Duottar and in 2019, Vuess. In 2021, Khomyuk entered the competition once again, this time as a solo act. Her entry was called Parrša vigket.

Awards
On April 27, 2019, Khomyuk received the Áillohaš Music Award, a Sámi music award conferred by the municipality of Kautokeino and the Kautokeino Sámi Association to honor the significant contributions the recipient or recipients has made to the diverse world of Sámi music.

Publications

Editorial work
 2014 – Са̄мь-рӯшш са̄ннҍнэххьк / Саамско-Русский словарь by A. A. Antonova

Discography

Compilation albums

 2002 – Sami Grand Prix 2002
 2003 – Sami Grand Prix 2003 together with Anfisa Ageeva
 2014 – Сборник саамских песен
 2015 – Сборник саамских сказок
 2017 – Богатырь Ляйне 
 2019 – Sámi Grand Prix 2019 together with Anfisa Ageeva
 2021 – Sámi Grand Prix 2021

References

1954 births
Living people
Russian Sámi people
Sámi musicians
Russian Sámi-language writers
20th-century Russian musicians
20th-century Russian women musicians
21st-century Russian musicians
21st-century Russian women musicians
People from Murmansk Oblast
Kildin Sámi